Following are the results of the 1986–87 season in Argentine football.

The competition saw Rosario Central win the Argentine Primera by a single point from fierce local rivals Newell's Old Boys. River Plate won the Copa Libertadores 1986 and followed it up with the Copa Intercontinental.

Rosario Central qualified for Copa Libertadores 1987 as champions of Argentina.
Teams highlighted in light blue qualified for the Liguilla Pre-Libertadores.

Top scorers

Relegation
Deportivo Italiano were relegated with the worst points average (0.600)
Temperley were relegated after losing 2–0 to Platense in the relegation playoff.

Liguilla Pre-Libertadores
Deportivo Armenio, Banfield and Belgrano de Córdoba qualified as the top 3 teams in the 2nd division.

Quarter finals

Semi-finals

Final

Independiente qualified for Copa Libertadores 1987.

Argentine clubs in international competitions

References

Argentina 1986-1987 by Javier Roimiser at rsssf.
Argentina 1980s by Osvaldo José Gorgazzi and Victor Hugo Kurhy at rsssf.
Copa Libertadores 1986 by Karel Stokkermans and John Beuker at rsssf.
Intercontinental 1986 by Osvaldo José Gorgazzi at rsssf.

 
Seasons in Argentine football